Ernst Kipfer (3 November 1915 – 7 February 2016) was a Swiss footballer who played for FC Basel. He played as goalkeeper.

Kipfer joined FC Basel's first team as reserve goalkeeper in their 1936–37 season. He played his domestic league debut for the club in the home game at the Landhof on 6 September 1936 as Basel were defeated 0–5 by Biel-Bienne. He was substituted in at half time for Eugène de Kalbermatten. This was his only game for the club for some time. He was about to move to the Racing Club Strasbourg but the outbreak of the Second World War prevented this transfer.

Kipfer re-joined the first team again in their 1940–41 season. Between the years 1936 and 1943 he played a total of 13 games for Basel. Nine of these games were in the Nationalliga, one in the Swiss Cup and the other three were friendly games.

Ernst Kipfer remained closely connected to the FCB as club member and interested supporter right up until he died at his home in Allschwil.

References

Sources
 Rotblau: Jahrbuch Saison 2017/2018. Publisher: FC Basel Marketing AG. 
 Die ersten 125 Jahre. Publisher: Josef Zindel im Friedrich Reinhardt Verlag, Basel. 
 Verein "Basler Fussballarchiv" Homepage

FC Basel players
Swiss men's footballers
Association football goalkeepers
1915 births
2016 deaths
Footballers from Basel